Oh Johnny, How You Can Love is a 1940 American film directed by Charles Lamont and starring Tom Brown and Peggy Moran. It was an early appearance of Laird Cregar.

The film cost $100,000.

Plot
Kelly Archer, an heiress trying to escape her controlling father and elope with an archeologist, runs into the truck of traveling salesman Johnny Sandham. She hitches a ride with Johnny. A bank robber known as The Weasel commandeers the truck and takes the two hostage. That night, stopping to have the truck's brakes fixed, Johnny dupes the Weasel into helping him win over Kelly: Johnny pretends to be gangster "Jersey Joe", and says they should kidnap Kelly for ransom. Kelly overhears their plan, and helps innkeeper Thistlebottom subdue both men. Kelly's father arrives to take his daughter home, but she rides off with Johnny.

References

External links

Oh Johnny How You Can Love at TCMDB

1940 films
American musical films
Films directed by Charles Lamont
1940 musical films
American black-and-white films
Universal Pictures films
1940s English-language films
1940s American films